Robin Persson (born December 5, 1985) is a Swedish professional ice hockey defenceman who currently plays for Timrå IK of the Swedish Elitserien.

Persson is originally from Nyköping and through junior and senior hockey in Västerås. He has premier league play with Nyköping and Oskarshamn. He made his Elitserien debut with Linköpings HC near the end of the 2008-09 season and has stayed with this elite hockey team to the end of the 2011-12 season.

References

External links

Living people
Linköping HC players
Timrå IK players
1985 births
Swedish ice hockey defencemen
People from Nyköping Municipality
Sportspeople from Södermanland County